Pseudodiptera alberici is a moth of the family Erebidae. It was described by Abel Dufrane in 1945. It is found in the Democratic Republic of the Congo and Kenya.

References

Syntomini
Moths described in 1945
Moths of Africa